Hoseyniyeh is a city in Khuzestan Province, Iran.

Hoseyniyeh or Hoseynieh may also refer to various places in Iran:
 Hoseyniyeh, Hormozgan
 Hoseyniyeh, Isfahan
 Hoseyniyeh, Markazi
 Hoseyniyeh-ye Khazir
 Hoseyniyeh-ye Mashkur
 Hoseyniyeh-ye Mir Shenan
 Hoseyniyeh-ye Olya
 Hoseynieh-ye Sar Bardian
 Hoseyniyeh Rural District, in Khuzestan Province